Deusdete Vasconcelos (born 25 January 1947) is a Brazilian boxer. He competed in the men's bantamweight event at the 1972 Summer Olympics. At the 1972 Summer Olympics, he lost to Kim Jong-ik of North Korea.

References

1947 births
Living people
Brazilian male boxers
Olympic boxers of Brazil
Boxers at the 1972 Summer Olympics
Sportspeople from São Paulo
Bantamweight boxers
20th-century Brazilian people